José Adriano Rodrigues Barata-Moura, GOSE (born 26 June 1948 in Lisbon) is a Portuguese philosopher, and a prestigious actual figure of the Portuguese culture. Dedicating his thought to many philosophical subjects such as politics, ethics and, most of all, to ontology. From May 7, 1998 until May 22, 2006, Barata-Moura served as the Rector of the University of Lisbon. He graduated from the University of Lisbon as a philosophy student in 1970. Nowadays, José Barata-Moura teaches Ancient Philosophy, the Philosophy of the German Idealism and Marxist Philosophy in the Faculty of Letters of the University of Lisbon. Still very active in his philosophical career, José Barata-Moura is a specialist in the German Idealism Philosophy, specially on Kant and Hegel, without mentioning his vast knowledge of Marxist thought.

He is member of the Presidency of Internationale Gesellschaft für dialektische Philosophie, and member of the Senate of the Convent for Europaische Philosophie und Ideengeschichte. José Barata-Moura is also a Correspondent, in the area of Humanities and Letters, of the Academy of Sciences of Lisbon.

José Barata-Moura was elected as a deputy of the European Parliament during the period 1993-1994.

He is also a longtime member of the Portuguese Communist Party, having written several essays on Marxist subjects.

Barata-Moura is also well known in Portugal as the author of several children's songs (e.g. Come a papa, Joana).

Books published
 1972 - Kant e o conceito de Filosofia
 1973 - Da redução das causas em Aristóteles
 1977 - Estética da canção política
 1977 - Totalidade e contradição
 1977 - O coelho barafunda
 1978 - Ideologia e Prática
 1979 - EPISTEME. Perspectivas gregas sobre o saber. Heraclito-Platão-Aristóteles
 1982 - Para uma crítica da "Filosofia dos valores"
 1986 - Da representação à "práxis"
 1986 - Ontologias da "práxis", e idealismos
 1990 - A "realização da razão" - um programa hegeliano?
 1994 - Marx e a crítica da "Escola Histórica do Direito"
 1994 - Prática. Para uma aclaração do seu sentido como categoria filosófica
 1998 - Materialismo e subjectividade
 1999 - Estudos de Filosofia Portuguesa
 2007 - O Outro Kant
2007 - Da Mentira: Um Ensaio - Transbordante de Errores
 2010 - Estudos sobre a Ontologia de Hegel. Ser, Verdade, Contradição
 2010 - Sobre Lénine e a Filosofia. A Reivindicação do Materialismo Dialéctico com Projecto
2012 - Totalidade e Contradição Acerca da Dialéctica
2013 - Filosofia em "O Capital". Uma Aproximação
2014 - Três Ensaios em Torno do Pensamento Político e Estético de Álvaro Cunhal
2015 - Marx, Engels e a Crítica do Utopismo
2017 - Ontologia e Política. Estudos em Torno de Marx - II
2018 - As Teses das «Teses». Para Um Exercício de Leitura

References

1948 births
Living people
People from Lisbon
20th-century Portuguese philosophers
21st-century Portuguese philosophers
Academic staff of the University of Lisbon
Portuguese Communist Party politicians
Marxist writers
University of Lisbon alumni